Zadneye is a rural locality (a village) and the administrative center of Zadneselskoye Rural Settlement, Ust-Kubinsky District, Vologda Oblast, Russia. The population was 466 as of 2002. There are 18 streets.

Geography 
Zadneye is located 19 km north of Ustye (the district's administrative centre) by road. Stafilovo is the nearest rural locality.

References 

Rural localities in Ust-Kubinsky District